Bruce Houston (born 26 August 1999) is an Irish rugby union player, currently playing for Edinburgh. He plays as a fly-half.

Rugby Union career

Professional career

Houston made his senior competitive debut for Ulster in their 40–7 defeat against provincial rivals Leinster in round 13 of the 2018–19 Pro14 on 5 January 2019. Houston replaced Angus Kernohan after 48 minutes. 

He joined Super 6 side Heriot's Rugby Club ahead of the 2021-22 season. 

He is Scottish-qualified, and signed for Edinburgh on a partnership deal in August 2022.

References

External links

Pro14 Profile

1999 births
Living people
Irish rugby union players
Ulster Rugby players
Heriot's RC players
Edinburgh Rugby players
Rugby union fly-halves
Rugby union fullbacks
Sportspeople from Ballymena